The Church of Jesus Christ of Latter-day Saints in Vermont refers to the Church of Jesus Christ of Latter-day Saints (LDS Church) and its members in Vermont.

Official church membership as a percentage of general population was 0.74% in 2014. According to the 2014 Pew Forum on Religion & Public Life survey, less than 1% of Vermonters self-identify themselves most closely with the LDS Church. The LDS Church is the 7th largest denomination in Vermont.

History

Joseph Smith, the LDS Church founder, was born in Sharon on December 23, 1805. Other early church leaders born in Vermont include Oliver Cowdery, who was first Assistant President of the Church, as well as 5 members of the original Quorum of the Twelve Apostles, Brigham Young, Heber C. Kimball, Luke S. Johnson and Lyman E. Johnson and William Smith.

Stake and Congregations

As of February 2023, the following congregations met in Vermont

Montpelier Vermont Stake
Burlington Ward
Lamoille Valley Ward
Lyndon Ward
Middlebury Ward
Montpelier Ward
Montpelier YSA Branch
Newport Branch
Rutland Branch
South Royalton Ward
St Albans Branch

Albany New York Stake
Bennington Branch

Concord New Hampshire Stake
Ascutney Ward

Missions
Missionary work started shortly after the Church was organized in 1830. The Eastern States Mission, the Church's 2nd mission (behind the British Mission), was established on May 6, 1839, but discontinued in April 1850. The Eastern States Mission was re-established in January 1893. On June 20, 1974, it was renamed the New York New York Mission. The Vermont Morristown Mission was organized from the New York New York Mission on July 1, 1987. The Vermont Cherry Hill was organized in 1995 then discontinued in 2010 and made up portions of the Vermont Morristown and the Pennsylvania Philadelphia Missions. As of June 2021, the entire state was covered either by the Morristown or Philadelphia Missions.

Temples
With exception of the Bennington Branch in southern Vermont, the state is in the Boston Massachusetts Temple District. The Bennington Branch is in the Hartford Connecticut Temple District.

See also

 The Church of Jesus Christ of Latter-day Saints membership statistics (United States)
Vermont: Religion

References

External links
 State Information (Vermont)
 North America Northeast Area
 ComeUntoChrist.org Latter-day Saints Visitor site
 The Church of Jesus Christ of Latter-day Saints Official site

Christianity in Vermont
Vermont